Mohandas B.A.L.L.B is a TV show broadcast on Zee TV in 1997–1998, with Pankaj Kapur in the lead role of a detective. He was also the director and producer of the series and wrote some of the material.  The show also starred Supriya Pathak, Seema Shinde, Nawazuddin Siddiqi, Aditya Srivastava, Mrs K, Brij Mohan, Jitendra Gupta and Salim Raza.

Cast 
Pankaj Kapur as Mohandas
Supriya Pathak as Mohan's wife
Seema Shinde as Mohan's fellow officer
Nawazuddin Siddiqui as Mohan's fellow officer
Ashutosh Rana as Mohan's fellow officer

References 

1990s Indian television series
Zee TV original programming